is a former Japanese football player.

Club statistics

References

External links

1982 births
Living people
Tokai University alumni
Association football people from Gunma Prefecture
Japanese footballers
J2 League players
Japan Football League players
Thespakusatsu Gunma players
Kataller Toyama players
Association football defenders